Over the course of his career, Antonio Aguilar made over 150 films.

Male actor filmographies
Mexican filmographies